In Singapore, there are numerous cemeteries that house Muslim graves. Many of them are not in use currently as most of the burials take place at Pusara Aman in Choa Chu Kang. This is a non-exhaustive list of the Muslim cemeteries that have been demolished such as Bidadari Cemetery, as well as cemeteries that have not been in use for years. Included in this list are Keramats (Mausoleums) that are present in Singapore.

Cemeteries

Bidadari Cemetery

History

Bidadari Cemetery used to be located in Toa Payoh, and is now a defunct cemetery. The cemetery was not specifically catered for Muslims, as it also housed Christian, Hindu, and Sinhalese graves. Bidadari Cemetery was opened in 1908, and was closed in 1972. After it was closed in 1972, the cemetery became a park for visitors to observe nature. The graves were exhumed from the years 2001 to 2006 to make room for new infrastructure and buildings.  Due to religious customs, the remains of the Muslims could not be cremated. Hence, they were relocated to Pusara Abadi in Choa Chu Kang. There was a Bidadari Mosque that was built in the Muslim cemetery that was constructed in 1932 by Syed Abdulrahman Bin Shaikh Alkaff, who was a prominent member of the Alkaff family in Singapore. However, it was demolished in 2007 after the exhumations of the graves ended.

The name "Bidadari" comes from the Malay word for "angel". Prior to the cemetery site, there was previously a Bidadari estate where the Istana Bidadari was built. Istana Bidadari was inhabited by Che Puan Besar Zubaidah, who was the second wife of Sultan Abu Bakar of Johor, son of Temenggong Daeng Ibrahim, who is buried at Makam Diraja Johor Telok Blangah.

Memorial
There are several prominent figures from all races that have been buried there over the years. Significant Muslim figures that have been buried there include Ahmad Bin Ibrahim, who was the Minister of Health of Singapore from 1959 until 1961 and the Minister of Labour until his death in 1962.

Singaporeans were concerned that the history of Bidadari Cemetery was being erased and something should be done to commemorate the historical figures who were buried there.  As a result, the National Heritage Board decided to relocate the cemetery gates and twenty tombstones of key historical figures, including Ahmad Ibrahim to Bidadari Memorial Garden at Mount Vernon.

Jalan Kubor Cemetery 
The Jalan Kubor Cemetery (translated to Cemetery Road Cemetery from Malay) is located at Victoria Street, near Kampong Glam. This cemetery is one of the oldest Muslim cemeteries in Singapore and houses many graves of important Muslim figures in the 19th and 20th Centuries. This cemetery is still standing.
Originally, the cemetery was meant for the descendants of Sultan Hussein, which was why the burial ground was originally named "Tombs of the Malayan Princes" on an old map of Singapore surveyed by G.D Coleman. The graves of the royal family members can be differentiated due to the mounds built below the graves, making them higher than the rest. Furthermore, royal graves were distinguished with yellow tombstones, as the colour yellow in Islam signifies royalty.

However, the cemetery houses graves not only from the royal family but there was a burial ground for Malays as well as Indian Muslims when Sultan Hussein's son, Sultan Ali Iskandar Shah, opened the cemetery to the public on the 26th of August, 1948. The proximity of the cemetery to the Sultan's palace made the cemetery a popular burial ground amongst the more wealthy Malay merchants and figures in Singapore.

Dr Imran Tajudeen, a professor at the Architecture department at the National University of Singapore, led a six-month study commissioned by the National Heritage Board to unravel the Malay World's history in connection to Singapore.  During this study, Dr Tajudeen and his team analysed the tombstones of the 4752 graves that are housed in the cemetery and established links to the history of Singapore based on the families that are buried there, and the languages of the tombstone inscriptions.

Some key figures that are buried in Jalan Kubor Cemetery include Haji Ambok Sooloh Bin Haji Omar who was one of the founders of Utusan Melayu, a Malay newspaper. Syed Omar Bin Ali Aljunied was also buried in Jalan Kubor Cemetery. He was a merchant and philanthropist who arrived in Singapore in the early 19th Century. He also donated and built a mosque, Masjid Omar Kampong Melaka.

Kubur Kassim (Siglap Muslim Cemetery)
Kubur Kassim (translated to Kassim Cemetery from Malay) is located at 426 Siglap Road, right in the middle of a private housing estate. The cemetery stopped accepting burials in the 1970s but the physical ground is still present. There is also a small surau in the middle of the cemetery, which is still in use by the cemetery's caretaker.

The entrance of Kubur Kassim is signified by a vivid yellow and green coloured gate that has Arabic inscriptions on it.  The usage of the colours yellow and green signifies the important colours in Islam. Green is commonly related to paradise, the Prophet, birth and nature. Yellow on the other hand signifies royalty.  The tombs that lie in this cemetery, are different as compared to the Muslim cemeteries that are present nowadays. Many of the tombs in Kubur Kassim are square-shaped, and not rectangular-shaped. 

There was also a widespread belief that supernatural beings were buried in this cemetery. These supernatural beings are called the Orang Bunian. These beings are spirits that come from a different dimension, yet live their lives on Earth like human beings.

Kubur Kassim also houses graves of significant members of the Malay Community. For example, Dr Hafeezudin Sirajuddin Moonshi currently lies in Kubur Kassim. Dr Moonshi opened the first Muslim clinic in 1916. Another important figure that lies in this cemetery would be Che Lembek Binte Abdin, who is the former headmistress of Kampong Glam Girl's School during the Second World War.

Keramats
Keramats are defined as the graves or tombs of deceased Muslim men who played a significant role in religion, such as Muslim saints. These sites that house the Keramats are typically visited as part of a pilgrimage to wish for something, or to pay their respects in the case that their wish got granted. However, the definition has evolved over the years to include graves or tombs of not only saints, but also rulers such as Sultans and Temenggongs.

Keramat Habib Noh
Keramat Habib Noh is located in Haji Muhammad Salleh Mosque at 37 Palmer Road. This shrine was built for a Muslim saint named Sayyid Noh bin Sayyid Mohamad bin Sayyid Ahmad Al-Habshi (or Habib Noh).

Description
The Keramat is housed at the top of the hill at 37 Palmer Road, with 49 steps leading to it. The steps leading to Habib Noh's tomb, as well as the room housing the tomb is adorned with green and yellow furnishing such as curtains. Green and yellow are the chosen colours due to their significance in Islam, which is a recurring theme that is observed in other Muslim cemeteries as well. Behind the tomb of Habib Noh lies the tomb of Sayid Abdur Rahman bin Salim Al Habsyi, the cousin of Habib Noh.

History
Habib Noh was a Muslim saint who died on the 27th of July, 1866 reported at the age of 78.  When he passed, his coffin was set to move to Bidadari Muslim Cemetery. However, his coffin was reported immovable, making the hill on Palmer Road the designated resting place of Habib Noh. His friend, Haji Muhammad Salleh was in the process of building a surau for Habib Noh but did not finish in time for the saint to see. The surau was completed in 1902. However, the surau was then destroyed and rebuilt into Haji Muhammad Salleh Mosque in 1903.

In 1890, the Keramat was renovated by Syed Mohamad Bin Ahmad Alsagoff, a Muslim merchant and philanthropist. He was also a part of the Alsagoff family in Singapore. The descendants of Syed Mohamad Bin Ahmad Alsagoff continued to maintain the tomb, until it landed in Majlis Ugama Islam Singapura (MUIS) jurisdiction in 1968.

Keramat Iskandar Shah
The mausoleum of Iskandar Shah is located at the top of Fort Canning Hill, formerly known as Bukit Larangan (translated to Forbidden Hill from Malay). It was named Forbidden Hill because it was believed that ancient kings were buried there.

Description
The mausoleum is housed under a hut at the top of Fort Canning Hill, and is open at all times for visitors.

History
Sultan Iskandar Shah (also known as Parameswara and Sri Tri Buana) was either the leader of pre-colonial Singapore in the 14th Century, or the son of the founder of Melaka who subsequently moved to Singapore. His identity is contested amongst scholars in the History field. Some scholars think that Parameswara and Iskandar Shah are the same person, while others think that when Parameswara came to Singapore, he converted to Islam and his name became Iskandar Shah.  Some believe that Iskandar Shah was the successor of Parameswara.  Iskandar Shah is also associated with another name, Sri Tri Buana (also known as Sang Nila Utama), who was the first king of Singapore in the Malay Annals.

In the Malay Annals, it is written that he and his companions sailed to Temasek where they saw an unknown animal while walking around the island, looking for food.  His companion informed him that the animal they saw was probably a lion and so Sang Nila Utama (Or Sri Tri Buana) decided to name the land they were on Singapura (Lion City). Ultimately, his identity and name are commemorated in Singapore through the shrine in Fort Canning Hill.

Keramat Bukit Kasita

Keramat Bukit Kasita (Also known as Makam Diraja Johor Telok Blangah) is located next to Masjid Temenggong Daeng Ibrahim (Temenggong Daeng Ibrahim Mosque) in Telok Blangah, Singapore.

Description
There are 32 graves in the cemetery, including the grave of Temenggong Abdul Rahman (Also known as Engku Abdul Rahman), Temenggong Daeng Ibrahim, and their family members. However, the tombs of the Temenggongs are placed inside the mosque, as a mausoleum (Keramat). The land that the mosque and cemetery lie on belongs to the Johor Sultanate, to this day.

History
The establishment of the cemetery and mausoleum dates back to when Temenggong Abdul Rahman was buried there in 1825. The year before his death, he built the Istana Lama at Telok Blangah, and that was his place of residence until his death. Eventually, the palace was demolished in 1954 and was replaced by a Bata Factory. Temenggong Abdul Rahman was the first Malay leader who talked about the formation of a British Settlement in Singapore and signed a preliminary treaty with Sir Stamford Raffles, with the condition the terms of the treaty were approved by his older brother, Tengku Husain (Also known as Sultan Hussein Shah).

Another prominent figure buried next to Temenggong Abdul Rahman is his successor and son, Temenggong Daeing Ibrahim. He was officially appointed the Temenggong of Johor by the British in 1841. He passed away in Istana Lama in 1862 and was buried in the cemetery.

References 

Islam in Singapore
Religious buildings and structures in Singapore
Cemeteries in Singapore